Bois-d'Arcy is the name of the following communes in France:

 Bois-d'Arcy, Yonne, in the Yonne department
 Bois-d'Arcy, Yvelines, in the Yvelines department